Vinička Vas is a settlement in the Municipality of Lenart in northeastern Slovenia. It lies in the Slovene Hills southwest of Hrastovec. The area is part of the traditional region of Styria. It is now included in the Drava Statistical Region.

A small chapel in the settlement dates to the early 20th century.

References

External links
Vinička Vas at Geopedia

Populated places in the Municipality of Lenart